This is a list of members of Parliament in Wales, elected for the Fifty-Third Parliament of the United Kingdom in the 2001 general election. They are arranged by party.  See also: Members of the National Assembly for Wales.

Labour Party
Nicholas Ainger
Donald Anderson
Kevin Brennan
Chris Bryant
Martin Caton
Ann Clwyd
Wayne David
Denzil Davies
Huw Edwards
Paul Flynn
Hywel Francis
Win Griffiths
Peter Hain
Dave Hanson
Dai Havard
Alan Howarth
Kim Howells
Huw Irranca-Davies (from 2002)
Jackie Lawrence
Jon Owen Jones
Martyn Jones
Alun Michael
Julie Morgan
Paul Murphy
Albert Owen
Sir Raymond Powell (died December 2001)
Chris Ruane
John Smith
Llew Smith
Mark Tami
Gareth Thomas
Don Touhig
Alan Williams
Betty Williams

Liberal Democrats
Lembit Öpik
Roger Williams

Plaid Cymru
Elfyn Llwyd
Adam Price
Simon Thomas
Hywel Williams

See also 

 Lists of MPs for constituencies in Wales

2001
Wales